Chergin Dillen Fillies (born 8 July 1997) is a South African rugby union player for the  in Super Rugby, the  in the Currie Cup and the  in the Rugby Challenge. His regular position is tighthead prop.

References

South African rugby union players
Living people
1997 births
Rugby union players from Cape Town
Rugby union props
Golden Lions players